Leeland station may refer to:

Leeland, Nevada, a former railway hamlet in Nye County, Nevada, also known as Leeland Station
Leeland Road station, a commuter rail station located in Stafford, Virginia
Leeland/Third Ward station, a light rail station in Houston, Texas

See also
Leeland (disambiguation)
Leyland railway station